In category theory, a category with a terminal object  is well-pointed if for every pair of arrows  such that , there is an arrow  such that . (The arrows  are called the global elements or points of the category; a well-pointed category is thus one that has "enough points" to distinguish non-equal arrows.)

See also
 Pointed category

References
 

Category theory